The Monroe County Courthouse in Madisonville, Tennessee was built in 1897.  It was listed on the National Register of Historic Places in 1995.

It is a red brick building with white trim and a hipped roof.

It was designed by architect Bauman Brothers and Co.; the building contractor was Gaylon Seldon Co.

The listing included a contributing object, a World War I memorial.

References

World War I memorials in the United States
County courthouses in Tennessee
National Register of Historic Places in Monroe County, Tennessee
Italianate architecture in Tennessee
Romanesque Revival architecture in Tennessee
Neoclassical architecture in Tennessee
Government buildings completed in 1897